Olivér Ágh (born 20 March 1975 in Dunaújváros, Fejér) is a retired male backstroke swimmer from Hungary, who competed in two consecutive Summer Olympics for his native country, in 1992 and 1996.

Results:

 1991 Junior European Championships, Antwerp: 2nd - 200m Backstroke   
 1992 Olympics, Barcelona: 27th - 200m Backstroke      
 1994 World Championships, Rome: 15th - 200m Backstroke     
 1996 Olympics, Atlanta: 12th - 200m Backstroke     
 1996 NCAA Division 1 Championships: 13th - 200 Backstroke
 1997 World university Games, Sicily: 7th - 200 Backstroke
 1999 World University Games, Palma de Mallorca: 7th - 200 Backstroke

References

kataca.hu: Ágh Norbertnek Czene az első menedzseltje 
kataca.hu: Profile

External links
 

1975 births
Living people
Sportspeople from Dunaújváros
Hungarian male swimmers
Male backstroke swimmers
Swimmers at the 1992 Summer Olympics
Swimmers at the 1996 Summer Olympics
Olympic swimmers of Hungary
Competitors at the 1997 Summer Universiade
Competitors at the 1999 Summer Universiade